Indonesian People's Wave Party, commonly abbreviated as Gelora (Passion), is a political party of Indonesia. The party establishment was declared on 10 November 2019, and its political party status was recognised by the Ministry of Law and Human Rights on 2 June 2020.

The party is founded by former Prosperous Justice Party (PKS) members Anis Matta and Fahri Hamzah, among others, with actor and former West Java deputy governor Deddy Mizwar also joined the new party. Gelora Party portrays itself as nationalist and Pancasialist despite their former Islamist Prosperous Justice Party background. Gelora Party aimed to attract undecided voters, and to participate in 2020 local elections.

References

Pancasila political parties
Political parties in Indonesia
Political parties established in 2019